Wear Valley or Wears Valley may refer to:

Wear Valley in County Durham, England
Weardale in County Durham
Wears Valley, Tennessee, an unincorporated community
Wear Cove, the valley in which Wears Valley, Tennessee is located